The year 1996 is the 8th year in the history of Shooto, a mixed martial arts promotion based in the Japan. In 1996 Shooto held 5 events beginning with, Shooto: Vale Tudo Junction 1.

Events list

Shooto: Vale Tudo Junction 1

Shooto: Vale Tudo Junction 1 was an event held on January 20, 1996, at Korakuen Hall in Tokyo, Japan.

Results

Shooto: Vale Tudo Junction 2

Shooto: Vale Tudo Junction 2 was an event held on March 5, 1996, at Korakuen Hall in Tokyo, Japan.

Results

Shooto: Vale Tudo Junction 3

Shooto: Vale Tudo Junction 3 was an event held on May 7, 1996, at Korakuen Hall in Tokyo, Japan.

Results

Shooto: Free Fight Kawasaki

Shooto: Free Fight Kawasaki was an event held on July 28, 1996, at Club Citta in Kawasaki, Kanagawa, Japan.

Results

Shooto: Let's Get Lost

Shooto: Let's Get Lost was an event held on October 4, 1996, at Korakuen Hall in Tokyo, Japan.

Results

See also 
 Shooto
 List of Shooto champions
 List of Shooto Events

References

Shooto events
1996 in mixed martial arts